Statistics of the Primera División de México for the 1977–78 season.

Overview

Atlante was promoted to Primera División.

This season was contested by 20 teams, and UANL won the championship.

Atlas was relegated to Segunda División.

After this season Deportivo Neza bought the Laguna franchise.

Teams

Group stage

Group 1

Group 2

Group 3

Group 4

Results

Relegation playoff

Unión de Curtidores won 4-2 on aggregate. Atlas was relegated to Segunda División.

Championship playoff

Quarterfinal

Aggregate tied. Tampico Madero won 4-2 on penalty shootout.

UNAM won 3-2 on aggregate.

Cruz Azul won 3-2 on aggregate.

UANL won 3-2 on aggregate.

Semifinal

UNAM won 5-2 on aggregate.

UANL won 3-1 on aggregate.

Final

UANL won 3-1 on aggregate.

References
Mexico - List of final tables (RSSSF)

Liga MX seasons
Mex
1977–78 in Mexican football